Rospo Pallenberg is a screenwriter and film director. He was involved in the writing of the John Boorman films Exorcist II: The Heretic, Excalibur, and The Emerald Forest.

He directed the 1989 film Cutting Class.

Pallenberg is the son of the Roman journalist Corrado Pallenberg (1912–1989), author of the book Vatican Finances (1971).

References

External links
 

Living people
Year of birth missing (living people)
American male screenwriters
American film directors